GRT may refer to:

 GRT Group, a former British bus operator
 GRT Records, a record label 
 Garo language of India and Bangladesh 
 General Recorded Tape, a defunct US company
 Grand River Transit, Waterloo, Ontario, Canada, a public transport operator 
 Grasser Racing Team, an Austrian auto racing team
 Grateley railway station, Hampshire, England (National Rail station code)
 Greenbrier River Trail, a state park in West Virginia, US
 Gross register tonnage, a measure of a ship's volume 
 Guangdong Radio and Television, China
 Gypsy, Roma and Travellers collectively; see The Traveller Movement